Lennert Teugels (born 9 April 1993) is a Belgian cyclist, who currently rides for UCI ProTeam .

Major results

2017
 3rd Overall Tour de Namur
1st Stage 3
 3rd Flèche Ardennaise
 6th Omloop Het Nieuwsblad U23
2018
 2nd Tour de Vendée
 3rd Overall Kreiz Breizh Elites
2019
 2nd Overall Tour de Liège
 7th Volta Limburg Classic
 7th Overall Flèche du Sud
2021
 Tour du Rwanda
1st  Mountains classification
1st  Sprints classification
2022
 2nd Overall International Tour of Hellas
1st Stage 3
 3rd Overall Belgrade Banjaluka
 9th Polynormande
2023
 1st  Mountains classification, La Tropicale Amissa Bongo
 9th Muscat Classic
 10th Per sempre Alfredo

References

External links

1993 births
Living people
Belgian male cyclists
People from Opwijk
21st-century Belgian people